S93 may refer to:
 S93 (New York City bus) serving Staten Island
 County Route S93 (Bergen County, New Jersey)
 , a submarine of the Royal Navy
 SIPA S.93, a French training aircraft